Prays fraxinella, also known as the ash bud moth, is a moth of the family Plutellidae found in Europe. The larvae are leaf miners, feeding on the leaves and buds of ash trees.

Description
The wingspan is 14–18 mm. The head is white or greyish ochreous. Forewings are white or greyish-ochreous; some blackish dorsal strigulae; a triangular blackish blotch, lighter or mixed with whitish on costa, extending along costa from near base to 2/3; some irregular blackish marks towards termen; sometimes the whole wing is unicolorous dark fuscous. Hind wings are rather dark grey. The larva is greenish, marbled with red -brown above; dorsal line deep green; head pale brown, dark-spotted; 2 with two black spots.

Adults are on wing from May to June and again in August in two generations depending on the location.

Prays fraxinella has two colour forms, the typical white and black colouration and the melanic form f.rustica.

Recently, the form f.rustica, that has an orange head has been separated into an entirely new species, Prays ruficeps.

Ovum
Eggs are laid on the twigs of ash (Fraxinus excelsior) and manna ash (Fraxinus ornus) in June and July.

Larva
When fully fed the larvae are 12 mm long and the body is greenish, with the head brown with black spots. As a juvenile leaf miner, the body is yellowish with a black head and anal plate, and as a bark miner the body is whitish.

The mine consists of an irregular small corridor with dispersed black frass. The corridor can widen into an irregular blotch with less frass. Mines begin at the site of the egg shell, but the larvae can leave this mine and start a new one elsewhere in the leaf. In the latter case the corridor begins with a small round opening. In the autumn, before the leaf is shed, larvae leave the mines and bore into the bark, where it hibernates. After hibernation they live as a bark miner and frass can be seen between the buds. As the larvae hollows out the shoot, it causes the leaves to droop. Sometimes, they feed externally in a loose spinning.

Pupa
The larvae pupate in an open network cocoon and can be found in May or June.

Gallery

References

 Bjerkander, C. (1784) Insect-Calender, for år 1784. Kongl. Vetenskaps Academiens nya Handlingar 5: 319–329. Stockholm (Johan Georg Lange).
 Millard, P. (2013) Prays fraxinella (Bjerkander) (Lep.: Praydidae) is not monophagous on Ash. The Entomologist's Record and Journal of Variation 125 (5): 171.
 Stainton, H. T. (1870) The natural history of the Tineina 11: I-XIII, 1-330, pl. I-VIII. London (John van Voorst) – Paris (Deyrolle) – Berlin (E. S. Mittler und Sohn). as Prays curtisellus.

External links
 Swedish Moths

Plutellidae
Leaf miners
Moths described in 1784
Moths of Asia
Moths of Europe
Taxa named by Clas Bjerkander